Grigory Tsezarevich Svirsky (September 29, 1921 – 2016) was a Russian-born Canadian writer.

Svirsky was born in Ufa in September 1921. He was a military pilot during World War II from 1941 to 1944, then worked as a journalist. After publishing several books, Svirsky openly criticized censorship in the Soviet Union, and all his writings were forbidden and destroyed in 1968. Svirsky also criticized the 1968 suppression of the Prague Spring by Soviet military forces. He was forced to emigrate to Israel on the personal request from KGB director Yuri Andropov in 1972.

He moved to Canada in 1975 and started teaching Russian literature in University of Toronto and University of Maryland. He published numerous fiction and non-fiction books, short stories, and plays. He was also an active participant of political discussions in RuNet, Russian blogosphere.

One of his recent books was about the Internet brigades - teams of FSB agents who conduct psychological operations in the internet against political bloggers. These "internet brigades" allegedly disseminate disinformation and prevent free discussion of undesirable subjects in the internet forums by harassing and intimidating the bloggers  He was interested in moral aspects of their work: "It seems that offending, betraying, or even "murdering" people in the virtual space is easy. This is like killing an enemy in a video game: one do not see a disfigured body or eyes of the person who is dying right in front of you. However, human soul lives by its own basic laws that force it to pay the price in the real life".

He died in 2016.

References

External links (Russian)
 Photo
 His biography
His biography and links to some books
 Memories about him
 Links to his books
Interview with G. Svirsky in "Nasha Canada" - Toronto russian newspaper

His books
Dead end of Lenin, Moscow, Publishing house "Soviet writer", 1962.                                               Full text in Russian
Hostages: The personal testimony of a Soviet Jew.  Vintage/Ebury (A Division of Random House Group), 1976, .  Full text in Russian
Polar tragedy, Frankfurt, "Posev", 1976.                                               Full text in Russian,  French translation: Tragedie Polarie, Quine, Montreal, 1978.
Breakthrough, New York, 1983.   Four chapters in Russian,  Hebrew translation: Hapriza by Maoz, Israel, 1990.
At the execution place. The literature of moral resistance,  1946-1986. Moscow, 1992.  Full text in Russian English version: A history of post-Soviet writing (The literature of the Moral Opposition), Ardis, Ann Arbor, USA, 1981, .
Soviet penal battalions  Full text in Russian
Luba means "love" or never-ending Nord-Ost. A non-fiction story. Jerusalem, 2004  Full text in Russian
 Anastasya. A story on-line (Full text in Russian)
Farewell to Russia, New York, 1986   Full text in Russian
Mother and stepmother, "Scholar", Toronto, Canada, 1990.   Full text in Russian
Forbidden story, "Scholar", Toronto, Canada, 1990.  Full text in Russian
Escape, Jerusalem, 1994  Full text in Russian
Little Andrei, Moscow, 1998.  Full text in Russian
On the islands of George Washington,  New York, 1998  Full text in Russian
Fuel pump kings. Russian gangsters in America 2000.  Full text in Russian
Masters of disguise. A story of Russian leaders. Moscow. 2002.   Full text in Russian
My Galich, a story of Alexander Galich   Full text in Russian

1921 births
2016 deaths
Canadian people of Russian-Jewish descent
Communist Party of the Soviet Union members
Writers from Ufa
Soviet emigrants to Canada
Soviet Jews in the military
Soviet military personnel of World War II
Soviet World War II pilots